The information regarding List of rivers in the Aysén Region on this page has been compiled from the data supplied by GeoNames. It includes all features named "Rio", "Canal", "Arroyo", "Estero" and those Feature Code is associated with a stream of water. This list contains 297 water streams.

Content
This list contains:
 Name of the stream, in Spanish Language
 Coordinates are latitude and longitude of the feature in ± decimal degrees, at the mouth of the stream
 Link to a map including the Geonameid (a number which uniquely identifies a Geoname feature)
 Feature Code explained in 
 Other names for the same feature, if any
 Basin countries additional to Chile, if any

List

 Rio Buta PalenaRío Buta Palena3877639STM(Rio Buta Palena, Rio Carrenleufu, Rio Corcobado, Rio Corcovado, Rio Palena, Río Buta Palena, Río Carrenleufú, Río Corcobado, Río Corcovado, Río Palena)
  Rio FrioRío Frio3969738STM
  Rio OesteRío Oeste3969744STM
  Rio RisopatronRio Risopatrón7116152STM
  Rio CesarRío Cesar12086909STM
  Rio RosselotRío Rosselot3872781STM
  Rio FigueroaRío Figueroa3889512STM
 Rio PicoRío Pico3841332STM(Rio Pico, Río Pico)(AR, CL)
 Rio JeinemeniRío Jeinemeni3853518STM(Rio Jeinemeni, Río Jeinemeni)(CL)
 Rio Mosco3843612STM(Rio Mosco, Río Mosco)(AR, CL)

  Estero Laura3969747STM
  Rio RodriguezRío Rodríguez3872940STM
  Estero Pampita3969749STM
  Rio AnihueRío Añihué3969665STM
  Estero Mirta3969751STM
  Arroyo Siberia3870936STM(Arroyo Siberia, Rio Silberia, Río Silberia)
  Rio PalenaRío Palena3894564STM
  Rio Cuarto7116147STM
  Rio Bahia MalaRío Bahía Mala3969631STM
  Rio Claro SolarRío Claro Solar3969754STM
  Rio CuevasRío Cuevas3969628STM(Rio Cuevas, Rio Water, Río Cuevas, Río Water)
  Estero El Negro3969753STM
  Rio QuintoRío Quinto3969758STM
  Estero Veco3969668STM
  Rio Melimoyu7116155STM
  Rio Santo DomingoRío Santo Domingo3969629STM
  Rio EricRío Eric3969669STM
  Rio CorrentosoRío Correntoso3893458STM
  Estero Mallines3969846STM
  Rio Dinamarca7116150STM
  Estero Rosado3872839STM
  Rio DientesRío Dientes3892444STM
  Rio BordaliRío Bordalí3898043STM
  Rio NevadosRío Nevados3878706STM
  Arroyo Pan de AzucarArroyo Pan de Azúcar3877437STM
  Rio Cacique BlancoRío Cacique Blanco3897466STM
  Rio TurbioRío Turbio3868883STM
  Rio PascuaRío Pascua3877110STM
  Rio VentisqueroRío Ventisquero3868467STM
  Arroyo del Poncho3875462STM
  Rio JorobadoRío Jorobado3886840STM
  Rio PedregosoRío Pedregoso3876899STM
  Estero Negro3878809STM
  Arroyo Loma Huacha3882622STM
  Rio NeptuneRío Neptune3878738STM
  Rio PantanosRío Pantanos3877290STM
  Estero de las Casas3896368STM
  Rio Mallin ChilenoRío Mallín Chileno3880831STM(Rio Mallin, Rio Mallin Chileno, Rio Mallín, Río Mallín Chileno)
  Rio MagdalenaRío Magdalena3881025STM
  Estero Las Golondrinas3884347STM
  Rio Overo NegroRío Overo Negro3877899STM
  Rio QueulatRío Queulat3874322STM
  Rio de la Loma BajaRío de la Loma Baja3882639STM(Rio La Loma Baja, Rio de la Loma Baja, Río La Loma Baja, Río de la Loma Baja)
  Estero La Turbina3883647STM
  Estero Los Patos3881624STM(Arroyo de los Patos, Estero Los Patos, Estero los Patos)
  Estero Piedras3876091STM
  Estero Winchester3867815STM
  Estero Buitre3897760STM
  Rio PedregosoRío Pedregoso3876898STM
  Estero Esperanza3889836STM
  Rio CisnesRío Cisnes3897542STM
  Estero SolisEstero Solís3870708STM
  Rio MoroRío Moro3879323STM
  Rio GrandeRío Grande3888774STM
  Arroyo Las Quemas3883976STM
  Rio PedregosoRío Pedregoso3876897STM
  Arroyo los Matreros3880327STM(Arroyo los Matreros, Quebrada Los Matreros)
  Rio CaronteRío Caronte3896562STM
  Rio TorcazaRío Torcaza3869611STM
  Arroyo Los Canelos3882287STM
  Estero Perdidos3876528STM
  Rio de las TorresRío de las Torres3869492STM
  Rio CisnesRío Cisnes3894594STM
  Rio TraviesoRío Travieso7626597STM
  Rio PicachoRío Picacho3876346STM
  Rio Uspallante7626595STM
  Rio PicaflorRío Picaflor3876342STM
  Rio El Toqui6342714STM
  Rio Presidente RooseveltRío Presidente Roosevelt3875187STM
  Rio La Gloria6343092STM
  Arroyo Pedregoso3876910STM
  Rio Turbio6343155STM
  Rio NireguaoRío Ñireguao3878604STM(Nirevao, Rio Nirehuau, Rio Nirihuao, Río Nirehuau, Río Ñirihuao, Ñirevao)(CL)
  Rio Pangal6458932STM
  Estero Feo3889543STM
  Rio CanonRío Cañón3896895STM
  Rio NorteRío Norte3878510STM
  Arroyo NireguaoArroyo Ñireguao3878603STM(Rio Coichel, Rio Goichel, Río Coichel, Río Goichel)(CL)
  Estero del Cinco3894621STM
  Rio Emperador GuillermoRío Emperador Guillermo3890117STM
  Estero Negro Juan3878759STM
  Rio El Malito6354892STM
  Estero Richards3873329STM
  Rio ManigualesRío Mañiguales3880708STM(Rio Manihuales, Rio Maniuales, Río Mañihuales, Río Mañiuales)(CL)
  Estero ColchonEstero Colchón3894304STM
  Rio TaboRío Tabo3870377STM
  Arroyo Punta del Monte3874761STM
  Rio MartaRío Marta3880417STM
  Estero Viviana3868027STM
  Rio TurbioRío Turbio3868882STM
  Rio arredondo6327095STM
  Rio de los PalosRío de los Palos3877536STM(Rio de Los Palos, Río de Los Palos)(CL)
  Rio Negro6331621STM
  Rio AisenRío Aisen3894563STM
  Rio Simpson conf .du Rio ManihualesRio Simpson conf .du Río Mañihuales6330229STM
  Rio AisenRío Aisén3900335STM(Rio Aysen, Río Aysen)
  Rio SimpsonRío Simpson3835234STM(Rio Simpson, Río Simpson)(AR)
  Rio AlvarezRío Álvarez3899856STM
  Rio BlancoRío Blanco3898196STM
  Rio Pescado6331620STM
  Arroyo del Salto3872511STM
  Rio Condor3898175STM
  Rio CorrentosoRío Correntoso3893457STM(Arroyo Grande)(CL)
  Rio RiescoRío Riesco3873308STM
  Rio CandelariaRío Candelaria3896961STM
  Arroyo Pedregoso3876909STM
  Arroyo Dangle3892745STM(Arroyo Dang)(CL)
  Rio BagualesRío Baguales3898996STM(Arroyo de los Baguales)(CL)
  Arroyo Niebla3878682STM
  Rio CoihaiqueRío Coihaique3894424STM(Rio Coyhaique)(CL)
  Rio QuetroRío Quetro3874328STM
  Rio ClaroRío Claro3894562STM
  Rio CondorRío Cóndor3893812STM
  Estero San SebastianEstero San Sebastián3871706STM
  Rio SimpsonRío Simpson3875500STM
  Rio Bongo6331618STM
  Rio Quetro6337679STM
  Rio Pollux6354975STM
  Rio Simpson6354877STM(Aisen sur)
  Rio Zancudo6354886STM
  Estero  Negro3878766STMI
  Rio Desplayado6354885STM
  Rio DesagueRío Desagüe3892634STM
  Rio Cajon BravoRio Cajòn Bravo6354880STM
  Rio HuemulesRío Huemules6354875STM(Rio Simpson o Aisen sur o Galera)
  Rio El Bayo6354884STM
  Rio Blanco6354876STM
  Rio La PalomaRío La Paloma3885116STM(Rio Paloma, Río Paloma)(CL)
  Rio OscuroRío Oscuro3877955STM
  Rio Cajon BlancoRio Cajòn Blanco6354879STM
  Rio Sin Nombre6354881STM
  Rio Los HuemulesRío Los Huemules3887666STM
  Arroyo Pichi Blanco3876308STM
  Estero Mogotes3879640STM(Rio Mogote, Río Mogote)(CL)
  Estero Balboa3898923STM(Rio Balboa, Río Balboa)(CL)
  Rio Azul7626518STM
  Rio Turbio6354873STM
  Arroyo del Humo3887446STM(Rio Humo)(CL)
  Rio SorpresaRío Sorpresa3870630STM
  Arroyo de Nieve3878669STM
  Estero del Bosque3898012STM
  Estero Parado3877222STM(Arroyo Parado, Estero Parado)
  Estero Portezuelo3875394STM
  Estero de las Mulas3879210STM(Arroyo de las Mulas, Estero de las Mulas)
  Estero Manso3880670STM
  Estero Limpio3883181STM(Arroyo Limpio, Estero Limpio)
  Estero Claro3894576STM(Arroyo Claro, Estero Claro)
  Estero Chorrillo3894831STM
  Estero PenascosoEstero Peñascoso3876673STM(Arroyo Penascoso, Arroyo Peñascoso, Estero Penascoso, Estero Peñascoso)
  Rio TeresaRío Teresa3869954STM
  Rio IbanezRío Ibáñez3887400STM
  Estero Lechoso3883450STM(Arroyo Lechoso, Estero Lechoso)
  Arroyo Las AnimasArroyo Las Ánimas3884645STM
  Rio Maria LuisaRío María Luisa3880487STM
  Arroyo del Salto3872510STM(Arroyo Fiero, Arroyo del Salto)
  Estero Huemula3887672STM(Arroyo Huemula, Estero Huemul, Estero Huemula)
  Rio ExploradoresRío Exploradores3889646STM
  Rio HuinaRío Huiña3887509STM
  Rio Presidente RiosRío Presidente Ríos3875189STM
  Rio SurRío Sur3870447STM
  Rio BeatrizRío Beatriz3898538STM
  Arroyo Largo3884731STM
  Arroyo Horquetas3887835STM
  Rio OscuroRío Oscuro3877954STM
  Rio VerdeRío Verde3868410STM
  Rio MurtaRío Murta3879144STM
  Rio CircoRío Circo3894610STM
  Rio EnganoRío Engaño3890082STM
  Rio ResbalonRío Resbalón3873405STM
  Rio AvellanosRío Avellanos3899097STM(Rio Avellanas, Río Avellanas)(CL)
  Estero del BanoEstero del Baño3898810STM
  Rio NorteRío Norte3878509STM
  Arroyo de las Chacras3895714STM
  Rio GualasRío Gualas3888565STM
  Arroyo Los Chacales3882228STM
  Arroyo Escondido3889928STM
  Arroyo Rocillo3872986STM
  Arroyo Tornillo3869596STM
  Rio TempanosRío Témpanos3870019STM
  Estero Newman3878704STM
  Arroyo Pedrero3876895STM
  Arroyo de las Casas3896369STM
  Arroyo Burgos3897708STM
  Rio BlancoRío Blanco3898194STM
  Rio DoroteaRío Dorotea3892235STM
  Estero La Horqueta3885644STM
  Rio TranquiloRío Tranquilo3869307STM
  Estero La PiramideEstero La Pirámide3885008STM
  Arroyo Colorado3894102STM
  Rio NegroRío Negro3878765STM
  Rio LucacRío Lucac3881229STM
  Estero Quebrada Honda3874493STM
  Rio LeonesRío Leones3883332STM
  Rio FieroRío Fiero3889521STM
  Rio AldunateRío Aldunate3900210STM
  Estero Pedregoso3876903STM
  Rio OscarRío Oscar3877961STM
  Rio ManigualesRío Mañiguales3880707STM(Rio Maniguales, Rio Manihuales, Rio Maniuales, Rió Mañihuales, Río Mañiguales, Río Mañiualés)
  Rio San TadeoRío San Tadeo3871608STM
  Rio GrandeRío Grande3888773STM
  Rio DeltaRío Delta3892663STM(Rio Delta, Rio de las Deltas, Río Delta, Río de las Deltas)
  Arroyo Lucio3881208STM
  Rio NievesRío Nieves3878666STM
  Rio GuisocaRío Guisoca3888253STM
  Rio AmarilloRío Amarillo3899797STM
  Estero Bertrand3898404STM
  Rio SolerRío Soler3870710STM
  Estero Chico3895193STM
  Rio FudosoRío Fudoso3889254STM
  Rio Aserradero QuemadoRío Aserradero Quemado3899240STM
  Estero Grande3888815STM
  Rio Claudio VicunaRío Claudio Vicuña3894559STM
  Rio Chacabuco6324480STM
  Rio Pancho CamposRío Pancho Campos3877446STM
  Rio Chacabuco Confluent du rio BakerRío Chacabuco Confluent du rio Baker3895793STM
  Estero El Molino3890977STM
  Rio MaitenRío Maitén3880957STM
  Arroyo Mayor3880272STM
  Estero El Auque3891925STM
  Arroyo Frutillar3889261STM
  Arroyo del Diablo3892535STM
  Rio BrownRío Brown3897872STM
  Arroyo Elba3891922STM
  Rio del SaltoRío del Salto3872500STM
  Arroyo Runque3872684STM
  Arroyo El Bosque3891834STM
  Estero La CanadaEstero La Cañada3886374STM
  Rio TranquiloRío Tranquilo3869306STM
  Arroyo San Lorenzo3871977STM
  Rio de Los NadisRío de Los Ñadis3881696STM(Rio de Los Nadis, Rio de las Nadis, Río de Los Ñadis, Río de las Ñadis)(CL)
  Rio BarrancosRío Barrancos3898701STM
  Rio VentisqueroRío Ventisquero3868466STM
  Arroyo Pedregoso3876908STM
  Arroyo Tranquera3869316STM
  Arroyo Abutarda3900722STM
  Rio BakerRío Baker3898929STM
  Rio IbanezRio IbáñezNef6355188STM
  Rio NefRío Nef3878958STM(Rio Neff, Río Neff)(CL)
  Rio CochraneRío Cochrane3894476STM
  Rio de La ColoniaRío de La Colonia3886222STM(Rio Activo, Rio de la Colonia, Río de la Colonia)(CL)
  Arroyo El Corral3891547STM
  Rio HuemulesRío Huemules3887665STM
  Arroyo LeonArroyo León3883384STM
  Arroyo La Gateada3885884STM
  Rio VargasRío Vargas3868581STM
  Arroyo El Encuentro3891405STM
  Arroyo Catarata3896170STM
  Rio Santo DomingoRío Santo Domingo3871311STM
  Rio NegroRío Negro3878764STM
  Rio BravoRío Bravo3897946STM
  Rio LlanadaRío Llanada3882999STM
  Rio Ano NuevoRío Año Nuevo3899560STM
  Rio del ArcoRío del Arco3899415STM
  Rio BostonRío Boston3898008STM
  Rio DesplayesRío Desplayes3892558STM(Rio Desplayer, Rio Desplayes, Río Desplayer, Río Desplayes)
  Rio del NorteRío del Norte3878506STM
  Rio SordoRío Sordo3870645STM
  Rio TranqueRío Tranque3869318STM
  Rio VentisqueroRío Ventisquero3868465STM
  Rio ResboleRío Resbole3873403STM
  Rio QuetruRío Quetru3874325STM
  Rio PililosRío Pililos3875994STM
  Rio ResbalonRío Resbalón3873404STM
  Rio VentisqueroRío Ventisquero3868464STM
  Arroyo Sucio3870506STM
  Rio PerezRío Pérez3876504STM
  Rio PascuaRío Pascua3877109STM
 Rio MayerRío Mayer3844658STM(Rio Mayer, Río Mayer)(AR)
  Rio BorquezRío Bórquez3898019STM
  Rio AzulRío Azul3899027STM
  Rio ColoradoRío Colorado3894023STM
  Rio EnganoRío Engaño3890081STM
  Rio Gabriel QuirozRío Gabriel Quiroz3889214STM
  Rio PabloRío Pablo3877850STM
  Rio El BagualRío El Bagual3891919STM
  Rio VentisqueroRío Ventisquero3868463STM
  Rio EnganoRío Engaño3890080STM
  Rio VargasRío Vargas3868580STM
  Rio GeorgeRío George3889005STM
  Rio PortezueloRío Portezuelo3875389STM
  Rios Pocas PilchasRíos Pocas Pilchas3875583STM
  Rio BravoRío Bravo3897945STM
  Rio MansoRío Manso3880669STM
  Rio ArosRío Aros3899322STM
  Rio VillalonRío Villalón3868171STM
  Rio TurbioRío Turbio3868881STM
  Rio PerezRío Pérez3876503STM
  Rio ObstaculoRío Obstáculo3878392STM

See also
 List of lakes in Chile
 List of volcanoes in Chile
 List of islands of Chile
 List of fjords, channels, sounds and straits of Chile
 List of lighthouses in Chile

Notes

References

External links
 Rivers of Chile
 Base de Datos Hidrográfica de Chile
 

Aysen